Slowhand at 70 – Live at the Royal Albert Hall is a November 2015 album by Eric Clapton recorded live at the Royal Albert Hall on 21 May 2015 during his "70th Birthday Celebration" tour. A film of the concert was released on 14 September 2015 via cinema broadcasting in various territories. The cinema release included a report on Clapton's history at the Royal Albert Hall. A DVD, Blu-ray, compact disc and gramophone record release of the performance was released on 13 November 2015.

Recording
Keyboardist Paul Carrack recalled in an interview with the Canadian National Post: "I thought the playing was amazing. Eric doesn't make much fuss about the fact that it's the 70th so in that respect it was just like any other gig but there was a special atmosphere in the hall. When we came off stage the first night Eric said he wasn't gonna let it go on. I think the second night must have been a lot better. [...] With Eric, playing at the Albert Hall … it's really just about the music. It feels like you're playing in a small club, almost. Especially when you’ve been out playing those big auditoriums, which aren't built for music. But the Albert Hall has this wonderful, intimate atmosphere".

Content

According to the official release announcement, the movie features "classic songs and fan favourites from throughout Eric Clapton's career", including tracks the British rock musician recorded with bands like Cream, Derek & the Dominos and titles Clapton made famous throughout his extensive career as a solo artist. The track listing features hit single releases including "Layla", "I Shot the Sheriff", "Tears in Heaven" and "Wonderful Tonight". A special featurette filmed for cinema audiences only consists of interviews by Paul Gambaccini with both fellow band members Paul Carrack, Andy Fairweather Low and Chris Stainton, as well as music journalists Paul Sexton and Hugh Fielder. Besides showing Clapton, who plays guitar and sings at the performance, the six-piece band of Stainton and Carrack on keyboards and Hammond organ, Nathan East on bass guitar, Steve Gadd on drums, and Michelle John and Sharon White singing background vocals is shown equally alongside scenes of the English venue.

Release
Both a trailer and an official announcement were released by Clapton's official management and concert promoters on 19 August 2015 over the internet and social media. The movie, featuring a selected number of songs performed by Clapton at London's Royal Albert Hall on 21 May 2015 during his "70th Birthday Celebration" tour, was released from 14 September 2015 onwards via cinema broadcasting worldwide under license of Arts Alliance, Warner Bros. Records and Eagle Rock Entertainment. On 1 September 2015 a sneak preview featuring Clapton's live performance of "Cocaine" was released. The release features a high-definition picture and 5.1 surround sound. On 31 August 2015 it was announced that a DVD, Blu-ray, compact disc and gramophone record version of the recordings would be released on 13 November 2015 through Eagle Rock Entertainment. A DVD and three vinyl record package was made available through pre-order via Amazon.com on 16 September 2015. Just before the release was made visible on Amazon.com, an executive of Germany's Warner Music Group told the German radio station Radio NRW that there would be limited gramophone record pressings of the recordings made for the market. On 13 November 2015, the following packages were released: Double DVD with double CD, gramophone record, double CD, DVD, Blu-ray disc and a triple vinyl release with included DVD.

Track listings

Personnel
Taken from the album's liner notes.

Eric Clapton – electric and acoustic guitar · lead vocals
Chris Stainton – keyboards
Paul Carrack – keyboards · Hammond organ · background vocals
Andy Fairweather Low - guitar ·  vocals - High Time We Went
Nathan East – bass guitar · background vocals
Steve Gadd – drums
Michelle John – background vocals
Sharon White – background vocals
Paul Gambaccini – interviews
Blue Leach – director
Simon Climie – audio mixing · audio production
Alan Douglas – engineer · additional engineering
Audrey Davenport – producer
Luca Ciuti – director of photography
Bob Ludwig – audio mastering
George Chin – photographs
Stuart Green – package design
Martin Dacre – legal issues
Michael Eaton – executive producer
Martin Dacre – executive producer
Peter Worsley – supervising producer
Simon Hosken – executive production
Melissa Morton-Hicks – production manager
Rebecca Bradshaw – legal issues
Charlotte Godfrey – legal issues
Paul Bullock – production assistant
Mark Fossitt – production co-ordinator
Claire Higgins – production co-ordinator
Rosie Holley – production manager
Terry Shand – executive producers
Geoff Kempin – executive producer

Critical reception
Music journalist Or Barnea of Utab Music calls the concert documentary "fantastic" and notes, Clapton and his band perform on stage "like never seen before".

Charts

Video certifications

References

External links

"Official Announcement". royalalberthall.com.

2015 films
2015 live albums
2015 video albums
British documentary films
Concert films
Eric Clapton video albums
Eagle Rock Entertainment live albums
Eagle Rock Entertainment video albums
Universal Music Group live albums
Universal Music Group video albums
Warner Records live albums
Warner Records video albums
2010s British films